Kingdom Force is a Canadian CGI animated children's television series created by Matthew Fernandes. The series is about the adventures of an animal superhero team. Summoned from five different kingdoms, the heroes pilot five rescue vehicles which combine to form a giant robot—the Alpha Mech.

Characters

Main

Luka
Voiced by Bobby Knauff. A fearless wolf from the Forest Kingdom, Luka is the team's leader. He pilots the Kingdom Rider 1, a red aerial gyro which forms the head and torso of the Alpha-Mech.

Jabari
Voiced by Tyler Nathan. The youngest member of the team, Jabari is a cheetah from the Plains Kingdom. He drives the Kingdom Rider 2, a yellow speed vehicle which forms the left leg of the Alpha-Mech.

TJ
Voiced by Mark Edwards. A badger from the underground dwellings of the Canyon Kingdom, TJ is the team analyst. He drives the Kingdom Rider 3, a green digging machine which forms the right leg of the Alpha-Mech.

Dalilah
Voiced by Julie Sype. The brains and sole female of the team, Dalilah is a gorilla from the Jungle Kingdom. She drives the Kingdom Rider 4, an orange crawler which forms the right arm of the Alpha-Mech.

Norvyn
Voiced by Dwayne Hill. Norvyn is a polar bear from the Ice Kingdom, and serves as the team's muscle. He drives the Kingdom Rider 5, a blue snowplow and submarine which forms the left arm of the Alpha-Mech.

Sprocket
Voiced by Jane Spence. Sprocket is a koala who designs the technology used by the team. She is in a high-tech wheelchair which has flight capabilities.

Recurring

Mayor Honeyclaw
Voiced by Jeff Lumby. A brown honey bear and the spokesperson of the Council at the Anopolis, Mayor Honeyclaw is a representative of the bears of the Ice Kingdom.

King Cat
Voiced by Rob Tinkler. A laid-back, easy-going lion from the Plains Kingdom, King Cat is the head of the cats and one of the Council Members at the Anapolis.

Professor Dunbit
Voiced by Brad Adamson. An orangutan from the Jungle Kingdom, Professor Dunbit is a scientist and inventor and represents the apes at the Anapolis.

Hoover
Voiced by Wyatt White. A blue gorilla from the Jungle Kingdom, Hoover is a close friend of Professor Dunbit and often assists with the Professor's experiments.

Liberty Longtail
Voiced by Katie Griffin. An arctic wolf from the Forest Kingdom, Liberty is a news reporter for the Five Kingdoms. With her camera operator Willow, she is often looking for the next big story.

Mittens McGuirk
Voiced by Megan Fahlenbock. Originally meant to be part of Kingdom Force, her sidekick Jabari was a last-minute replacement when Mittens refused to join.

Jalopi
Voiced by Samantha Weinstein. A mandrill from the Jungle Kingdom, Jalopi is a big fan of Kingdom Force. She really wants to be a hero, but often makes mistakes and inadvertently causes trouble for the team. She drives a recycling truck (which she calls her "Jalopoimobile") and has a pink doll named Binky.

Antagonists

Dr. Sabre
Voiced by Dwayne Hill. The CEO of Kittycorp Industries, Dr. Sabre is the most frequently recurring villain in the series. He often schemes to boost his company's sales or simply for self-pleasure, but often than not his schemes result in failure. Dr. Sabre has two grizzly bears, Gunter and Gustav (voiced by Mark Edwards), who serve under him.

Envie Fernandez
Voiced by Nicki Burke. A devious fox bandit from the Forest Kingdom, Envie lives up to her name. Despite owning a fancy car and having advanced spy gadgetry at her disposal, she always seeks to pilfer what isn't hers.

Max Volume
Voiced by Danny Smith. A honey badger from the Canyon Kingdom, Max is a renegade rock-and-roll player who was exiled when his music caused underground cave-ins. He always seeks an audience for his "concerts", but no one likes his loud music - especially the badgers.

Funbit 9000
Funbit is a robotic virtual pet created by Professor Dunbit, originally designed to interact with technology. After having juice spilled on it, Funbit goes rogue and now infects any technology it can access. Funbit considers Jabari to be its best friend, since he volunteered to look after it.

Episodes

Release

Kingdom Force first Premiered on CBC Television in 2020 as part of its CBC Kids block. Later in 2020, It premiered on Boomerang
in the United Kingdom. and in 2023 it Premiered on Sonshine Media Network International in the Philippines.

External links
 Official website
 

2010s Canadian animated television series
2020s Canadian animated television series
2010s Canadian science fiction television series
2020s Canadian science fiction television series
2019 Canadian television series debuts
Canadian computer-animated television series
Canadian children's animated action television series
Canadian children's animated adventure television series
Canadian children's animated comic science fiction television series
Canadian children's animated science fantasy television series
Canadian children's animated superhero television series
English-language television shows
CBC Kids original programming
Television series by Boat Rocker Media
Television series about wolves
Fictional cheetahs
Fictional badgers
Animated television series about apes
Animated television series about bears
Fictional polar bears
Television series about koalas